The Pulaski Citizen is a local newspaper serving Pulaski, Tennessee. It is currently available in both print and online editions. Between online and print editions, total circulation for the newspaper is listed at 3,500.

History 
The Pulaski Citizen was founded in 1854 as a four page weekly. It has been in continuous publication since 1866.

In the years after the Civil War, the paper's editor was L.W. McCord, whose brother Frank McCord was a founding member of the Ku Klux Klan. During this period L.W. McCord feigned ignorance of what the Ku Klux Klan was, while simultaneously printing messages from them in the paper that he claimed to be mysteriously delivered. Subsequently, Laps D. McCord became the owner, passing it on to others in the McCord family after his death.

In 1892 the Citizen was purchased by a Nashville businessman, leaving the McCord family.

References

External links
 

Newspapers published in Tennessee
Giles County, Tennessee
Publications established in 1854
1854 establishments in Tennessee